Elios Manzi (born 28 March 1996) is an Italian judoka. He competed at the 2016 Summer Olympics in the men's 60 kg event, in which he was eliminated in the second round by Kim Won-jin.

References

External links
 
 
 
 

1996 births
Living people
Italian male judoka
Olympic judoka of Italy
Judoka at the 2016 Summer Olympics
Judoka at the 2014 Summer Youth Olympics
Sportspeople from Messina
21st-century Italian people